Burlin Saheed (3 January 1942 – 15 April 2009) was a Guyanese cricketer. He played in three first-class matches for British Guiana from 1965 to 1973.

See also
 List of Guyanese representative cricketers

References

External links
 

1942 births
2009 deaths
Guyanese cricketers
Guyana cricketers